Watch Hill is a small hill lying on the north-western fringe of the Lake District in England. The name Setmurthy Common is sometimes used (including by Alfred Wainwright in his book The Outlying Fells of Lakeland) to refer to the area including the highest point, with "Watch Hill" describing the area to the west of the summit. It should not be confused with another Watch Hill some 19 km to the south-west, near Whitehaven, which is only 172 m (564 ft) high. The name "The Hay" is also used when referring to the area west of the summit.

Despite its low height (just 833 feet) it is a Marilyn (a hill with topographic prominence of at least 150m) because of the large height separation from its neighbours. This 'detachedness' means that it is an excellent viewpoint. Skiddaw, Blencathra, the Lord's Seat group and Grisedale Pike are all seen, and there is a first-class view of the Cockermouth area and the Solway Coast AONB.

The hill is a popular climb with Cockermouth folk, along with its lower neighbour Slate Fell.

He comments that "It is easily attained with a minimum of effort: a stroll on grass so simple that boots are incongruous footwear for it and bare feet appropriate".

References

Marilyns of England
Fells of the Lake District
Cockermouth